Christian Rudolph (born 15 February 1949) is a retired East German sprinter who specialized in the 400 metres hurdles. He won a silver medal at the 1971 European Championships. In semifinals of the 1972 Summer Olympics he tore his Achilles tendon and tumbled, causing the nearby runner Dieter Büttner to fall too. The injury forced Rudolph to immediately retire from athletics. Domestically he won the East German 400 m title in 1969–1972. In retirement Rudolph worked as a teacher of law and physical education in Cottbus.

References

1949 births
Living people
People from Bautzen (district)
East German male hurdlers
European Athletics Championships medalists
Athletes (track and field) at the 1972 Summer Olympics
Olympic athletes of East Germany
Sportspeople from Saxony